The Luck of Roaring Camp is a 1911 Australian feature-length film directed by W. J. Lincoln now considered a lost film. It was highly regarded in its day, in part because it was based on a play that was popular with audiences.

It was one of several films Lincoln made with the Tait family, who had produced The Story of the Kelly Gang.

Plot
The setting is California during the California Gold Rush. On the California goldfields, Will Gordin is falsely accused of murder and is about to be lynched when his girlfriend rides to the rescue. Scenes included:
Tom Barnes at Bay. 
Fun in a Roaring Camp Saloon. 
The Murder of Old Pard.
A Duel to the Death. 
The Throw of the Dice.

Cast
Ethel Buckley
Robert Inman
John Cosgrove

Production
It was based on a stage adaptation of the story by Francis Bret Harte which had proved popular with Australian audiences as performed by George Marlow's Dramatic Company since 1910.

In February 1911 the Bulletin reviewed a George Marlow production at the Princess Theatre in Melbourne saying:
When   "The Luck of Roaring Camp   ”   was staged in Sydney   •by George Marlow, Ltd., a year ago.   The Bulletin remarked that the bellow drama had taken the name of Bret Harte’s novel in vain.   Probably the audience at Melb.   Princess’s last Saturday didn’t seek for Bret Harte’s story in the drama that wore its title, but was merely looking for a   mining camp and listening for roars.   In which case the audience’s expectations were fulfilled.   The mine, located in America, provides Diver with lurid opportunities in the way of murder and false accusation; but he is ultimately brought to grief by a   hero who wins the girl and secures the property, and, in fact, gets the Luck.   Many things, including some stirring episodes of comic relief, happen before the ends of poetic justice are served.   If the people who goto the Princess’s are fond of this sort of melodrama, this is the sort of melodrama which should suit them down to the ground and up to the roof.
The partnership of Millard Johnson and Willard Gibson decided to make a film version.

The George Marlow company provided the cast for the film, with the lead played by Marlow's wife Ethel Buckley. A cast of over a hundred was reportedly used.

Reception
The movie premiered at the Glacarium Theatre in Melbourne, where it attracted strong crowds, then the Palace in Sydney.

It followed the release of Lincoln's earlier film The Mystery of the Hansom Cab.

Reviews were generally strong. The critic from the Sydney Morning Herald called it:
A thrilling story without words that is complete in itself without the words and that makes the drama more realistic than ever it could be on a stage without the aid of the pictures. The play has been carefully selected for this method of portrayal because it teems with exciting episodes and thrilling incidents in the life of the hard-living westerners. One part in particular that could never be seen on a stage without the camera is the splendid exhibition of horsemanship shown by a team of rough riders who were specifically employed for the purpose... almost every foot of it [the film] is bristling with exciting incidents.

References

External links
 
The Luck of Roaring Camp at AustLit
 Complete text of original story at Project Gutenberg

1911 films
1911 lost films
Australian black-and-white films
Australian silent feature films
Australian films based on plays
Films based on short fiction
Lost Australian films
Films about the California Gold Rush
Films directed by W. J. Lincoln